Mark Leonard Litchman Jr. (April 14, 1925 – September 8, 2021) was an American lawyer and politician from the state of Washington.

Born in Seattle, he was the son of prominent lawyer Mark M. Litchman. He attended the University of Washington in sociology and graduated with an LL.B. A veteran of World War II, having served in the United States Navy, he is an attorney and former president of a real estate firm.

Litchman was elected to the Washington House of Representatives in 1955, for district 45 (parts of King County), as a Democrat. He served until 1973. In 1961, he was majority leader of the House.

Litchman was married and had three children. He died on September 8, 2021, at the age of 96.

References

1925 births
2021 deaths
Democratic Party members of the Washington House of Representatives
United States Navy personnel of World War II
University of Washington College of Arts and Sciences alumni
University of Washington School of Law alumni
Washington (state) lawyers
People from Seattle